The "2004–05 Botola season" of the first division of Moroccan football.

Teams

 CODM Meknès
 Hassania Agadir
 Raja Casablanca
 Wydad Casablanca
 Maghreb Fez
 Jeunesse Massira
 SCCM Mohammédia
 Olympique Khouribga
 AS Salé
 FAR Rabat
 IZK Khemisset
 Olympique Safi
 IR Tanger
 Union Touarga
 Mouloudia Oujda
 Kawkab Marrakech

Final league standings

Teams that qualified for international competitions 
CAF Champions League : FAR Rabat and Raja Casablanca
Arab Champions League : Raja Casablanca, Wydad Casablanca and Olympique Safi
CAF Confederation Cup : Olympique Khouribga

Top scorers 
12 Goals
Mohamed Armoumen - FAR Rabat
11 Goals
Hicham Aboucherouane - Raja Casablanca
9 Goals
Didier Knippa - CODM Meknes
Soufiane Alloudi - Raja Casablanca
8 Goals
Hicham Jouiâa - Olympique Safi
7 Goals
Dlimi Laâroussi - Jeunesse Massira
Jaouad Ouaddouch - FAR Rabat
Amine Kabli - AS Salé
Osmane Diop - IR Tanger
Khalid Bakhouch - IZK Khemisset
Rachid Nourri - SCCM de Mohammédia
6 Goals
Youssef Mrabeh et Abdelali Boustani - Union de Touarga
Rafik Abdessamad - Olympique Khouribga
Mohamed Benchrifa - Widad Casablanca
Mohcine Mabrouk - Olympique Safi
Adil Lotfi - Kawkab Marrakech

External links
RSSSF competition overview

Botola seasons
Morocco
1